Coldharbour is an area of the London Borough of Havering by the River Thames and southwest of the Rainham Marshes Nature Reserve. It is the location of Coldharbour Point, where there has been a lighthouse since 1885. This point is adjacent to the town of Erith in Bexley, across the Thames. The nearest accessible settlement on land is the town of Rainham, which is connected by Coldharbour Lane; the village of Wennington is also nearby but not accessible by road (both are separated by the A13 and marshlands). The area around the point is mainly industrial land known as the Freightmaster Estate depot. The London Loop passes through Coldharbour on its way east to Purfleet in Thurrock.

History
Coldharbour was an estate primarily in the ancient parish of Wennington. It included Little Coldharbour (also partly in Rainham), Coldharbour Point and Great Coldharbour. It was originally a marsh island.

A ferry (known as the 'short ferry' in contrast to the 'long ferry' to London) operating from Coldharbour Point to Erith (then in Kent) on the southern bank of the Thames existed from the Middle Ages until the 19th century. Plaques entitled 'Pilgrim Ferry' commemorate this in Coldharbour and Erith.

Gallery

References

Districts of the London Borough of Havering
Areas of London
Districts of London on the River Thames
Port of London